The Tioga Central Railroad was a heritage railroad operating on a portion of the Wellsboro and Corning Railroad between Wellsboro, Pennsylvania and Corning, New York. During the tourist season, which lasted from June to October, it operated excursion trains on a sector of this line, from Wellsboro, Pennsylvania to Tioga, Pennsylvania.

Due to covid-19 capacity restrictions the line had suspended passenger operations during 2020 and 2021.  In 2022 the railroad was reported to have permanently closed and its website was off-line.

Rolling stock
14—An ALCO S-2.  Built in 1947 in Schenectady, NY.  #14 is a turbo-charged 6-cylinder, 1000 horsepower, 539 motor unit with Blunt trucks and friction bearings.  It was acquired by the Tioga Central Railroad in 1984. Sold to Livonia, Avon and Lakeville Railroad in 2014. Currently active as LAL 14.
47—An ALCO RS-1.  Built in 1945 for Washington Terminal Company.  Became Amtrak #47 in 1984.  Purchased by Tioga Central Railroad in 1986.  Scrapped at Wellsboro in 2014.
62—An ALCO RS-1.  Built in 1950, is a turbo-charged 6-cylinder,  unit with friction bearing trucks.  First used on the Washington Union Terminal Railroad in Washington, DC.  Purchased for service by the Wellsboro & Corning Railroad in 2007. Scrapped at Wellsboro in 2014.
240—An ALCO RS-1. Built in 1945 for New York, Susquehanna & Western Railroad. Purchased in 1980s by the Tioga Central and restored to NYS&W maroon and silver paint scheme with TCRR markings. Scrapped at Wellsboro in 2014.
506—An ALCO RS-3. First built as an ALCO RS3 for the Delaware & Hudson RR in 1952. Acquired by the Tioga Central Railroad in 1989 and renumbered #506. Sold to Livonia Avon & Lakeville Railroad and then to their sister railroad, The Western New York & Pennsylvania. It was in service as WNYP 406.

References

External links

Former official Tioga Central Railroad website[Archived 15 June 2021]

Transportation in Tioga County, Pennsylvania
Transportation in Steuben County, New York